Jason Spitz (born December 19, 1982) is a former American football center who last played for the Seattle Seahawks of the National Football League (NFL). He was drafted by the Green Bay Packers in the third round of the 2006 NFL Draft. He won Super Bowl XLV with the Packers over the Pittsburgh Steelers. He played college football at Louisville.

Early years
Spitz attended Bolles High School in Jacksonville, Florida. He was a first-team All-First Coast selection as a two-way lineman. In his senior year he had 10 sacks and 56 total tackles in the year.

College career
Spitz started all four years at Louisville, where he was a first-team All-Big East.

2002
Spitz was originally meant to redshirt his freshman year but was made the starting right guard during the game with Duke.

2003
Spitz was part of a highly successful offensive line that only allowed 13 sacks in 13 games and helped Louisville rank in the top 10 in rushing.   He was appointed as a 2nd team All American All-Conference USA.

2004
Spitz had a highly successful junior season and started all 12 games at right guard. The Cardinal offense led Division I-A in total offense, scoring, and pass efficiency rating. He only allowed  sacks that season.

2005
In his senior year, he was moved to left guard and helped the Cardinals once again rank in the top tenth in scoring, third in pass efficiency, and third in scoring. He allowed a career-low two sacks.

Professional career

Green Bay Packers
Spitz was ranked the sixth best offensive guard in the NFL Draft. He was taken in the 3rd round (75th overall).

Jacksonville Jaguars
Spitz agreed to a multi-year deal with the Jacksonville Jaguars in 2011.

Spitz spent the entire 2012 season on injured reserve.

The Jaguars released Spitz on August 19, 2013.

Seattle Seahawks
Spitz signed a one-year deal with the Seahawks on September 25, 2013. He was released on October 12.

References

External links
Seattle Seahawks bio

1982 births
Living people
Players of American football from Jacksonville, Florida
American football offensive guards
Louisville Cardinals football players
Green Bay Packers players
Jacksonville Jaguars players
Seattle Seahawks players
Bolles School alumni
People from Boardman, Ohio